The St. Lucia Athletics Association (SLAA) is the national governing body for athletics in Saint Lucia, inclusive of track and field, cross country running, road running and racewalking. The Athletics Association was formerly known as the St. Lucia Amateur Athletics Association. The organisation was founded in 1977 to promote Track and Field in Saint Lucia. In 1978 the SLAA became an affiliate member of the world governing body for athletics, then called the International Amateur Athletics Federation, and now known as the International Association of Athletics Federations.

Based at Olympic House on Barnard Hill in Castries, the SLAA is a non-profit organisation, led by a President, Cornelius Breen, elected at a Biennial General Meeting of the organisation in 2018. Mr. Breen replaced Andrew Magloire, who had served from 2016. Mr. Magloire previously served as president in the 1980s. Mr. Breen had also previously served two terms as president in the 2000's.  The SLAA is involved in many aspects of the sport at the local, national, and international level - coaching education, sports science and athlete development, youth programmes and masters (age 40+) competition.

Data 
Mailing Address:GM 697
Gable Woods Mall, Castries, St. Lucia, West Indies

President: Mr. Cornelius Breen

Secretary: Lisa Joseph

Physical Address: Olympic House, Barnard Hill, Castries, St. Lucia, West Indies

History 
SLAA was founded as St. Lucia Amateur Athletic Association in 1977 and was affiliated to the IAAF in 1978.

Affiliations 
SLAA is the national member federation for Saint Lucia in the following international organisations:
International Association of Athletics Federations (IAAF)
North American, Central American and Caribbean Athletic Association (NACAC)
Association of Panamerican Athletics (APA)
Central American and Caribbean Athletic Confederation (CACAC)
Moreover, it is part of the following national organisations:
Saint Lucia Olympic Committee (SLOC)

National records 
SLAA maintains the Saint Lucian records in athletics.

References 

Saint Lucia
Sports organizations established in 1977
Athletics
National governing bodies for athletics